This page documents the tornadoes and tornado outbreaks of 1948, primarily in the United States. Most tornadoes form in the U.S., although some events may take place internationally. Tornado statistics for older years like this often appear significantly lower than modern years due to fewer reports or confirmed tornadoes. Also, prior to 1950, tornadoes were not officially surveyed by the U.S. Weather Bureau, which would later become the National Weather Service, and thus had no official rating. All documented significant tornadoes were instead given unofficial ratings by tornado experts like Thomas P. Grazulis.

All documented significant tornadoes prior to 1950 in the United States were given unofficial ratings by tornado experts like Thomas P. Grazulis, which this article uses for the ratings below. Most of these records are limited to significant tornadoes; those rated F2 or higher on the Fujita scale, or which caused a fatality. Some events listed by Grazulis were likely tornado families rather than single tornadoes. There are also no official tornado counts for each month, so not every month is included in this article. In subsequent years, the documentation of tornadoes became much more widespread and efficient, with the average annual tornado count being around 1,253. Outside the United States, various meteorological organizations, like the European Severe Storms Laboratory rated tornadoes, which are considered official ratings.

Events

United States yearly total

January

January 1

Tornadic activity continued into the new year from the previous day. An intense tornado, with an estimated intensity of F3, struck Atlanta, Carmack, and Mantee, Mississippi, scattering furniture for miles. One person was killed in Mantee. Later in the day, a tornado destroyed seven farms and tore the second story off an eighth farm. The tornado had an estimated strength of F2. Around the same time, a long-track tornado impacted Clermont, Brown, Clinton, and Fayette counties in Ohio.

February

February 13
An F3 tornado struck Newton, Mississippi, which killed five people and injured 36 others. Thirty large and small homes were completely destroyed with debris scatted for miles and the tornado cut “a freight train into two parts”. It was noted that the path of this tornado was S-shaped or it was two tornadoes.

February 26–27

On the night of February 26, an F2 tornado destroyed seven homes and damaged 32 in Woodson, Texas. Three people were injured with two requiring hospitalization. After midnight, an F1 tornado briefly touched down near Bartonville, Texas. One victim died after she was pinned under a house and was unable to escape when coals from an overturned stove set it on fire. The following afternoon, F2 tornado damaged five homes and a store in Centerton, Indiana.

March

March 20–25

Two F3 tornadoes struck the Tinker Air Force Base. The first tornado injured several people when it shattered the glass on an airplane and caused $10 million in damage. The second tornado damaged more aircraft and caused $6 million in damage. The first ever tornado warning preceded the second tornado.

May

May 24 (Germany)
A significant tornado, rated F2/T5 by the European Severe Storms Laboratory struck Ahrenshagen-Daskow, Germany.

June

June 4 (Soviet Union)

July

July 22 (Germany and Belarus)

It was noted that this tornado was visually observed by a person as it occurred over a rural, cropland. About an hour after the F1/T3 tornado, another tornado struck Nuremberg, killing 11 people and injuring four others while it destroyed 40 homes. The European Severe Storms Laboratory did not give a rating to the tornado, however, it was noted that it was a “strong tornado”, meaning equivalent to at least F2 on the Fujita scale. About one hour after the Nuremberg tornado, a long-track tornado struck Auerbach in der Oberpfalz, killing a 12-year old girl. The tornado traveled  due east. Like the Nuremberg tornado, the European Severe Storms Laboratory did not give a rating to the tornado, however, it was noted that it was a “strong tornado”, meaning equivalent to at least F2 on the Fujita scale. About an hour after the previous tornado, a fourth tornado struck Novy Pahost, Belarus. A barn was destroyed, other buildings were “almost fully destroyed”, and a women was lifted by the tornado, which received a rating of F1 from the European Severe Storms Laboratory. It was noted that the Belarusian State University conducted research on this tornado.

September

September 13 (Denmark)
Emergency management reported a tornado that ripped the roof off a farmhouse in Strandby, Denmark. The European Severe Storms Laboratory rated this tornado F2 on the Fujita scale.

September 14 (Italy)
A waterspout came ashore in Anzio, Italy, which threw a mobile home  and threw a car “violently” into a tree. Other structures sustained damage and tree damage occurred. This tornado has not received a rating from the European Severe Storms Laboratory. The La Stampa newspaper wrote an article about the “exceptionally violent” tornado, saying it lasted for 20 minutes as it caused damage. According to La Stampa, a wooden and brick home was completely destroyed, ten homes had their roofs completely torn off, and about 50 large pine trees were completely uprooted. The tornado caused several million lire in damage.

October

October 18 (United Kingdom)
A tornado, rated F2/T4 by the European Severe Storms Laboratory struck St Albans, England. It was noted that a damage survey was conducted by a “severe weather expert” with no further information given.

November

November 5

December

December 13 (United Kingdom)
A tornado, rated F2/T5 by the European Severe Storms Laboratory struck Dudley, England. It was noted that a damage survey was conducted by a “severe weather expert” with no further information given.

Notes

References 

Torn
Tornado-related lists by year
1948 meteorology